Extended Display Identification Data (EDID) and Enhanced EDID (E-EDID) are metadata formats for display devices to describe their capabilities to a video source (e.g. graphics card or set-top box). The data format is defined by a standard published by the Video Electronics Standards Association (VESA).

The EDID data structure includes manufacturer name and serial number, product type, phosphor or filter type (as chromaticity data), timings supported by the display, display size, luminance data and (for digital displays only) pixel mapping data.

DisplayID is a VESA standard targeted to replace EDID and E-EDID extensions with a uniform format suited for both PC monitor and consumer electronics devices.

Background

EDID structure (base block) versions range from v1.0 to v1.4; all these define upwards-compatible 128-byte structures. Version 2.0 defined a new 256-byte structure but it has been deprecated and replaced by E-EDID which supports multiple extension blocks. HDMI versions 1.0–1.3c use E-EDID v1.3.

Before Display Data Channel (DDC) and EDID were defined, there was no standard way for a graphics card to know what kind of display device it was connected to. Some VGA connectors in personal computers provided a basic form of identification by connecting one, two or three pins to ground, but this coding was not standardized.

This problem is solved by EDID and DDC, as it enables the display to send information to the graphics card it is connected to. The transmission of EDID information usually uses the Display Data Channel protocol, specifically DDC2B, which is based on I²C-bus (DDC1 used a different serial format which never gained popularity). The data is transmitted via the cable connecting the display and the graphics card; VGA, DVI and HDMI are supported.

The EDID is often stored in the monitor in the firmware chip called serial EEPROM (electrically erasable programmable read-only memory) and is accessible via the I²C-bus at address . The EDID PROM can often be read by the host PC even if the display itself is turned off.

Many software packages can read and display the EDID information, such as read-edid for Linux and DOS, PowerStrip for Microsoft Windows and the X.Org Server for Linux and BSD unix. Mac OS X natively reads EDID information and programs such as SwitchResX or DisplayConfigX can display the information as well as use it to define custom resolutions.

E-EDID was introduced at the same time as E-DDC, which supports multiple extensions blocks and deprecated EDID version 2.0 structure (it can be incorporated in E-EDID as an optional extension block). Data fields for preferred timing, range limits, and monitor name are required in E-EDID.  E-EDID also supports dual GTF timings and aspect ratio change.

With the use of extensions, E-EDID string can be lengthened up to 32 KBytes.

EDID Extensions assigned by VESA
Timing Extension
Additional Timing Data Block (CEA EDID Timing Extension)
Video Timing Block Extension (VTB-EXT)
EDID 2.0 Extension
Display Information Extension (DI-EXT)
Localized String Extension (LS-EXT)
Microdisplay Interface Extension (MI-EXT)
Display ID Extension
Display Transfer Characteristics Data Block (DTCDB)
Block Map
Display Device Data Block (DDDB): contains information such as subpixel layout
Extension defined by monitor manufacturer: According to LS-EXT, actual contents varies from manufacturer.  However, the value is later used by DDDB.

Revision history
August 1994, DDC standard version 1 – introduce EDID v1.0.
April 1996, EDID standard version 2 – introduce EDID v1.1.
November 1997, EDID standard version 3 – introduce EDID v1.2 and EDID v2.0.
September 1999, E-EDID Standard Release A – introduce EDID v1.3 and E-EDID v1.0, which supports multiple extensions blocks.
February 2000, E-EDID Standard Release A - introduce E-EDID v1.3 (used in HDMI), based on EDID v1.3. EDID v2.0 deprecated.
September 2006, E-EDID Standard Release A – introduce E-EDID v1.4, based on EDID v1.4.

Limitations 
Some graphics card drivers have historically coped poorly with the EDID, using only its standard timing descriptors rather than its Detailed Timing Descriptors (DTDs).  Even in cases where the DTDs were read, the drivers are/were still often limited by the standard timing descriptor limitation that the horizontal/vertical resolutions must be evenly divisible by 8.  This means that many graphics cards cannot express the native resolutions of the most common wide screen flat panel displays and liquid crystal display televisions.  The number of vertical pixels is calculated from the horizontal resolution and the selected aspect ratio. To be fully expressible, the size of wide screen display must thus be a multiple of 16×9 pixels. For 1366×768 pixel Wide XGA panels the nearest resolution expressible in the EDID standard timing descriptor syntax is 1360×765 pixels, typically leading to 3 pixel thin black bars. Specifying 1368 pixels as the screen width would yield an unnatural screen height of 769.5 pixels.

Many Wide XGA panels do not advertise their native resolution in the standard timing descriptors, instead offering only a resolution of 1280×768. Some panels advertise a resolution only slightly smaller than the native, such as 1360×765. For these panels to be able to show a pixel perfect image, the EDID data must be ignored by the display driver or the driver must correctly interpret the DTD and be able to resolve resolutions whose size is not divisible by 8. Special programs are available to override the standard timing descriptors from EDID data. Even this is not always possible, as some vendors' graphics drivers (notably those of Intel) require specific registry hacks to implement custom resolutions, which can make it very difficult to use the screen's native resolution.

EDID 1.4 data format

Structure, version 1.4

Detailed Timing Descriptor

When used for another descriptor, the pixel clock and some other bytes are set to 0:

Display Descriptors

Currently defined descriptor types are:
 : Display serial number (ASCII text)
 : Unspecified text (ASCII text)
 : Display range limits.  6- or 13-byte (with additional timing) binary descriptor.
 : Display name (ASCII text).
 : Additional white point data.  2× 5-byte descriptors, padded with 0A 20 20.
 : Additional standard timing identifiers.  6× 2-byte descriptors, padded with 0A.
 : Display Color Management (DCM).
 : CVT 3-Byte Timing Codes.
 : Additional standard timing 3.
 : Dummy identifier.
 : Manufacturer reserved descriptors.

Display Range Limits

Descriptor

With GTF secondary curve

With CVT support

Additional white point descriptor

Color management data descriptor

CVT 3-byte timing codes descriptor

Additional standard timings

EIA/CEA-861 extension block 

The CEA EDID Timing Extension was first introduced in EIA/CEA-861, and has since been updated several times, most notably with the 861-B revision (which was version 3 of the extension, adding Short Video Descriptors and advanced audio capability/configuration information), 861-D (published in July 2006 and containing updates to the audio segments), 861-E in 2008, and 861-F which was published on June 4, 2013.  According to Brian Markwalter, senior vice president, research and standards, CEA, 861-F "includes a number of noteworthy enhancements, including support for several new Ultra HD and widescreen video formats and additional colorimetry schemes.”

Version CTA-861-G, originally published in November 2016, was made available for free in November 2017, along with updated versions -E and -F, after some necessary changes due to a trademark complaint. All CTA standards are free to everyone since May 2018.

The most recent version is CTA-861-H, published in January 2021, available for free after registration. An amendment, CTA-861.6, was published in February 2022, and includes a new formula to calculate Video Timing Formats, OVT.

Version 1 of the extension block (as defined in CEA−861) allowed the specification of video timings only through the use of 18-byte Detailed Timing Descriptors (DTD) (as detailed in EDID 1.3 data format above).  In all cases, the "preferred" timing should be the first DTD listed in a CEA EDID Timing Extension.

Version 2 (as defined in 861-A) added the capability to designate a number of DTDs as "native" and also included some "basic discovery" functionality for whether the display device contains support for "basic audio", YCbCr pixel formats, and underscan.

Version 3 (from the 861-B spec) allows two different ways to specify the timings of available digital TV formats: As in Version 1 & 2 by the use of 18-byte DTDs, or by the use of the Short Video Descriptor (SVD) (see below). HDMI 1.0–1.3c uses this version.

Version 3 also includes four new optional types of data blocks: Video Data Blocks containing the aforementioned Short Video Descriptor (SVD), Audio Data Blocks containing Short Audio Descriptors (SAD), Speaker Allocation Data Blocks containing information about the speaker configuration of the display device, and Vendor Specific Data Blocks which can contain information specific to a given vendor's use. Subsequent versions of CTA-861 defined additional data blocks.

CEA EDID Timing Extension data format - Version 3

The Data Block Collection contains one or more data blocks detailing video, audio, and speaker placement information about the display. The blocks can be placed in any order, and the initial byte of each block defines both its type and its length:

If the Tag code is 7, an Extended Tag Code is present in the first payload byte of the data block, and the second payload byte represents the first payload byte of the extended data block.

Once one data block has ended, the next byte is assumed to be the beginning of the next data block. This is the case until the byte (designated in byte 2, above) where the DTDs are known to begin.

Audio Data Blocks contain one or more 3-byte Short Audio Descriptors (SADs).  Each SAD details audio format, channel number, and bitrate/resolution capabilities of the display as follows:

Video Data Blocks will contain one or more 1-byte Short Video Descriptors (SVDs).

Notes: Parentheses indicate instances where pixels are repeated to meet the minimum speed requirements of the interface. For example, in the 720x240p case, the pixels on each line are double-clocked. In the (2880)x480i case, the number of pixels on each line, and thus the number of times that they are repeated, is variable, and is sent to the DTV monitor by the source device.

Increased Hactive expressions include “2x” and “4x” indicate two and four times the reference resolution, respectively.

Video modes with vertical refresh frequency being a multiple of 6Hz (i.e. 24, 30, 60, 120, and 240Hz) are considered to be the same timing as equivalent NTSC modes where vertical refresh is adjusted by a factor of 1000/1001. As VESA DMT specifies 0.5% pixel clock tolerance, which 5 times more than the required change, pixel clocks can be adjusted to maintain NTSC compatibility; typically, 240p, 480p, and 480i modes are adjusted, while 576p, 576i and HDTV formats are not.

 The EIA/CEA-861 and 861-A standards included only numbers 1–7 and numbers 17–22 (only in -A) above (but not as short video descriptors which were introduced in EIA/CEA-861-B) and are considered primary video format timings.
 The EIA/CEA-861-B standard has the first 34 short video descriptors above. It is used by HDMI 1.0–1.2a.
 The EIA/CEA-861-C and -D standards have the first 59 short video descriptors above. EIA/CEA-861-D is used by HDMI 1.3–1.3c.
 The EIA/CEA-861-E standard has the first 64 short video descriptors above. It is used by HDMI 1.4–1.4b.
 The CTA-861-F standard has the first 107 short video descriptors above. It is used by HDMI 2.0–2.0b.
 The CTA-861-G standard has the full list of 154 (1–127, 193–219) short video descriptors above. It is used by HDMI 2.1.

A Vendor Specific Data Block (if any) contains as its first three bytes the vendor's IEEE 24-bit registration number, least significant byte first. The remainder of the Vendor Specific Data Block is the "data payload", which can be anything the vendor considers worthy of inclusion in this EDID extension block. For example, IEEE registration number  means this is a "HDMI Licensing, LLC" specific data block (contains HDMI 1.4 info),  means this is a "HDMI Forum" specific data block (contains HDMI 2.0 info),   means this is "DOLBY LABORATORIES, INC." It starts with a two byte source physical address, least significant byte first. The source physical address provides the CEC physical address for upstream CEC devices. HDMI 1.3a specifies some requirements for the data payload.

If a Speaker Allocation Data Block is present, it will consist of three bytes.  The second and third are reserved (all ), but the first contains information about which speakers are present in the display device:

References

External links
edid-decode utility
edidreader.com – Web Based EDID Parser
Edid Repository – EDID files  repository
Display Industry Standards Archive
UEFI Forum PNP IDs

Display technology
VESA